Delwar Hossain may refer to:

Delwar

 Delwar Hossain (cricketer)
 Delwar Hossain (Faridpur politician) (c. 1934–2020)
 Delwar Hossain (Barguna politician) (c. 1955–2023)
 Delwar Hossain Khan
 Delwar Hossain Khan Dulu
 Delwar Hossain Sayeedi
 Khandaker Delwar Hossain
 Md. Delwar Hossain

See also 
 Dilwar Hussain